Yongyi Township is an rural township in Shaoshan City, Xiangtan City, Hunan Province, China.  it had a population of 10,600 and an area of .

Administrative division
The township is divided into seven villages: Baiyu Village, Fengmu Village, Changhu Village, Shaonan Village, Yongquan Village, Shishan Village, and Donghu Village.

Economy
Rice, pig, black goat are important to the economy.

Attractions
Huguo Temple is a Buddhist temple on the township.

Celebrity
, a major general in the People's Liberation Army.
, revolutionist.
, a general of the Republic of China Army.

References

Historic township-level divisions of Shaoshan